Michael Vermaak (born 10 October 1979) is a South African rugby union player, currently playing with Eastern Province Grand Challenge club side Despatch.. His regular position is number eight.

Career

He rejoined  in 2005 where he became a regular in the team.

However, he then suffered a series of injuries and missed the entire 2010 season. In 2011, he joined local club team Despatch.

He was also included in the Southern Kings training squad to play against the British & Irish Lions during their 2009 tour, but he failed to make the final 22-man squad.

References

South African rugby union players
Living people
1979 births
Free State Cheetahs players
Falcons (rugby union) players
SWD Eagles players
People from Uitenhage
Rugby union number eights
Rugby union players from the Eastern Cape